Reinhard Beer (born 2 October 1969) is an Austrian luger who has competed since 1990. A natural track luger, he won five medals at the FIL World Luge Natural Track Championships with two gold (Men's doubles: 1996, Mixed team: 2005), one silver (2000), and two bronzes (Men's doubles: 1998, Mixed team: 2007).

Beer also won two medals in the men's doubles event at the FIL European Luge Natural Track Championships with a silver in 2002 and a bronze in 1997.

References
FIL-Luge profile
Natural track European Championships results 1970-2006.
Natural track World Championships results: 1979-2007

External links
 

 A-league rivalry cups

1969 births
Living people
Austrian male lugers